Albert Español Lifante (born 29 October 1985) is a Spanish water polo player. At the 2012 Summer Olympics, he competed for the Spain men's national water polo team in the men's event. He is 6 ft 2 inches tall. At club level, he plays for Spanish powerhouse CN Atlètic-Barceloneta.

Honours
Florentia
LEN Euro Cup runners-up: 2012–13 
CN Atlètic-Barceloneta
LEN Champions League: 2013–14
LEN Super Cup: 2014
Spanish Championship: 2000–01, 2002–03, 2005–06, 2006–07,2008–09, 2009–10, 2010–11, 2012–13, 2013–14, 2014–15, 2015–16, 2017–18
Copa del Rey: 2001, 2004, 2006, 2007,2009, 2010, 2014, 2015, 2016, 2018
Supercopa de España: 2001, 2003, 2004, 2006, 2007,2009, 2010, 2011,2013, 2015, 2016, 2018
Olympiacos
Greek Championship: 2016–17

Awards
European Championship Top Scorer: 2014 Budapest 
Spanish Championship Top Scorer: 2013–14 with CN Atlètic-Barceloneta, 2020–21 with CN Echeyde
 LEN Champions League Final Six MVP: 2014 with CN Atlètic-Barceloneta

See also
 Spain men's Olympic water polo team records and statistics
 List of World Aquatics Championships medalists in water polo

Notes

References

External links
 

Spanish male water polo players
Living people
Olympic water polo players of Spain
Olympiacos Water Polo Club players
Water polo players at the 2012 Summer Olympics
1985 births
World Aquatics Championships medalists in water polo
Competitors at the 2013 Mediterranean Games
Competitors at the 2018 Mediterranean Games
Mediterranean Games silver medalists for Spain
Mediterranean Games medalists in water polo
21st-century Spanish people